The Australian Book Industry Awards (ABIA) are publishers' and literary awards held by the Australian Publishers Association annually in Sydney "to celebrate the achievements of authors and publishers in bringing Australian books to readers". Works are first selected by an academy of more than 200 industry professionals, and then a shortlist and winners are chosen by judging panels.

The inaugural event was held in July 2006.

2018 winners 
The 2018 ABIA winners were announced on 3 May, with Jessica Townsend's Nevermoor receiving three awards:

 ABIA book of the year: Nevermoor, Jessica Townsend
 Biography of the year award: Working Class Man, Jimmy Barnes
 General fiction book of the year: The Secrets She Keeps, Michael Robotham
 General non-fiction book of the year: The Trauma Cleaner, Sarah Krasnostein
 Literary fiction book of the year: See What I Have Done, Sarah Schmidt
 Illustrated book of year: Maggie's Recipe for Life, Maggie Beer and Ralph Martins
 International book of year: Good Night Stories for Rebel Girls, Elena Favilli and Francesca Cavallo
 Small publisher adults book of the year: The Australian Bird Guide, Peter Menkhorst, Danny Rogers, Rohan Clarke et al
 Small publisher children’s book of the year: It's OK to Feel the Way You Do, Josh Langley
 The Matt Richell award for new writer of the year: Nevermoor, Jessica Townsend
 Book of the year for older children (ages 13+): Begin, End, Begin: A #LoveOzYA Anthology, edited by Danielle Binks
 Book of the year for younger children (ages seven to 12): Nevermoor, Jessica Townsend
 Children's picture book of the year (ages up to six): No One Likes a Fart, Zoë Foster Blake
 Audiobook of the year: The 91-Storey Treehouse, Andy Griffiths and Terry Denton, narrated by Stig Wemyss
 The Lloyd O'Neill hall of fame award for services to the Australian book industry: Suzy Wilson
 The Pixie O'Harris award for outstanding commitment to children's literature: Jane Covernton
 Publisher of the year: HarperCollins
 Small publisher of the year: Thames & Hudson Australia
 National book retailer of the year: Dymocks
 Independent book retailer of the year: Readings
 Rising star award: Shalini Kunahlan, marketing manager at Text Publishing

2019 winners
Trent Dalton's Boy Swallows Universe picked up four awards in the 2019 ABIA awards. Winners were:
ABIA book of the year: Boy Swallows Universe, Trent Dalton
Biography of the year award: Eggshell Skull, Bri Lee
General fiction book of the year: The Lost Flowers of Alice Hart, Holly Ringland
General non-fiction book of the year: No Friend But the Mountains: Writing from Manus Prison, Behrouz Boochani, Omid Tofighian (translator)
Honourable mention for non-fiction book of the year: Any Ordinary Day, Leigh Sales
Literary fiction book of the year: Boy Swallows Universe, Trent Dalton
Illustrated book of year: Family: New vegetable classics to comfort and nourish, Hetty McKinnon
International book of year: Less, Andrew Sean Greer
Small publisher adults book of the year: Growing Up Aboriginal in Australia, Dr Anita Heiss (ed.)
Small publisher children's book of the year: Whisper, Lynette Noni
The Matt Richell award for new writer of the year: Boy Swallows Universe, Trent Dalton
Book of the year for older children (ages 13+): Jane Doe and the Cradle of All Worlds, Jeremy Lachlan
Book of the year for younger children (ages seven to 12): The 104-Storey Treehouse, Andy Griffiths, Terry Denton
Children's picture book of the year (ages up to six): All the Ways to be Smart, Davina Bell and Allison Colpoys
Audiobook of the year: Boy Swallows Universe, Trent Dalton, Narrator Stig Wemyss
The Lloyd O'Neill hall of fame award for services to the Australian book industry: Richard Walsh
The Pixie O'Harris award for outstanding commitment to children’s literature: Kathy Kozlowski
Publisher of the year: Pan Macmillan Australia
Small publisher of the year: Affirm Press
Honourable mention: Magabala Books
National book retailer of the year: Booktopia
Independent book retailer of the year: Mary Martin Bookshops
Rising star award: Ella Chapman, head of marketing communications at Hachette Australia

2020 winners 
The 2020 awards were announced at a virtual event hosted by Casey Bennetto on 13 May. Winners were:

 ABIA book of the year: Bluey: The Beach, Ludo Studio, BBC Studios and PRH Australia
Biography of the year award: When All is Said & Done by Neale Daniher
General fiction book of the year: Bruny, Heather Rose
General non-fiction book of the year: Kitty Flanagan’s 488 Rules for Life, Kitty Flanagan
Literary fiction book of the year: The Weekend, Charlotte Wood
Illustrated book of year: The Whole Fish Cookbook, Josh Niland
International book of year: The Testaments, Margaret Atwood
Small publisher adults book of the year: Sand Talk, Tyson Yunkaporta
Small publisher children's book of the year: Love Your Body, Jessica Saunders, illustrated by Carol Rossetti
The Matt Richell award for new writer of the year: Your Own Kind of Girl, Clare Bowditch
Book of the year for older children (ages 13+): Welcome To Your Period, Yumi Stynes and Melissa Kang
Book of the year for younger children (ages seven to 12): The 117-Storey Treehouse, Andy Griffiths, Terry Denton
Children's picture book of the year (ages up to six): Bluey: The Beach, Ludo Studio, BBC Studios and PRH Australia
Audiobook of the year: No Friend But the Mountains: Writing from Manus Prison, Behrouz Boochani. Narrators: Benjamin Law, Omid Tofighian, Isobelle Carmody, Janet Galbraith, Mathilda Imlah, Geoffrey Robertson, Richard Flanagan, Sarah Dale, Thomas Keneally and Yumi Stynes
The Lloyd O'Neill hall of fame award for services to the Australian book industry: Helen Garner
 The Pixie O'Harris award for outstanding commitment to children’s literature: Erica Wagner
 Publisher of the year: Allen & Unwin
Small publisher of the year: Magabala Books
Bookshop of the year: Books Kinokuniya
Book retailer of the year: Readings
Rising star award: Hazel Lam, senior book designer at HarperCollins

2021 winners 
The 2021 awards were announced at Carriageworks on 28 April at an in-person and virtual event hosted by Casey Bennetto. Winners were:

 ABIA book of the year: Phosphorescence, Julia Baird
 Biography of the year award: The Happiest Man on Earth, Eddie Jaku
 General fiction book of the year: The Dictionary of Lost Words, Pip Williams
 General non-fiction book of the year: Phosphorescence, Julia Baird
 Literary fiction book of the year: A Lonely Girl is a Dangerous Thing, Jessie Tu
 Illustrated book of year: In Praise of Veg, Alice Zaslavsky
 International book of year: Such a Fun Age, Kiley Reid
 Small publisher adults book of the year: The Animals in That Country, Laura Jean McKay
 Small publisher children's book of the year: Bindi, Kirli Saunders, illustrated by Dub Leffler
 The Matt Richell award for new writer of the year: The Coconut Children, Vivian Pham
 Book of the year for older children (ages 13+): The Left-Handed Booksellers of London, Garth Nix
 Book of the year for younger children (ages seven to 12): The Grandest Bookshop in the World, Amelia Mellor
 Children's picture book of the year (ages up to six): Our Home, Our Heartbeat (Adam Briggs, Kate Moon and Rachael Sarra
 Audiobook of the year: Tell Me Why, Archie Roach, narrated by the author
 The Lloyd O'Neill hall of fame award for services to the Australian book industry: Mandy Macky
 The Pixie O'Harris award for outstanding commitment to children’s literature: Maryann Ballantyne
 Publisher of the year: Penguin Random House Australia
 Small publisher of the year: University of Queensland Press
 Bookshop of the year: Avid Reader, Brisbane
 Book retailer of the year: Readings
 Rising star award: Pooja Desai, head of design at Hardie Grant Children’s Publishing

References

Further reading
 Books + Publishing: Tag abia (Earlier lists and winners are available via links from this search.)

External links

Australian fiction awards
Australian non-fiction book awards
Australian booksellers
Australian literary awards
Awards established in 2006
Australian literature-related lists